Barbatula samantica is a species of ray-finned fish in the family Balitoridae.
It is found only in Turkey.
Its natural habitat is rivers.
It is threatened by habitat loss.

References

samantica
Endemic fauna of Turkey
Fish described in 1978
Taxonomy articles created by Polbot